Oliver's warty pig or Mindoro warty pig (Sus oliveri) is a small species in the pig genus (Sus) which can only be found on the island of Mindoro in the central Philippines. This species previously treated to be a subspecies of S. philippensis,  was shown to be morphologically and genetically different.

This species is heavily hunted and is extremely rare.

See also 
Wild pigs of the Philippines
Philippine warty pig

References

External links
Classification on Animal Diversity
Ungulates of the world  – Sus oliveri on list

Sus (genus)
Mammals of the Philippines
Endemic fauna of the Philippines
Fauna of Mindoro
Mammals described in 1997